Maxim Braun (born 16 April 1993) is a Kazakhstani biathlete. He competed in the 2018 Winter Olympics.

References

1993 births
Living people
Biathletes at the 2018 Winter Olympics
Kazakhstani male biathletes
Olympic biathletes of Kazakhstan
Asian Games medalists in biathlon
Biathletes at the 2017 Asian Winter Games
Medalists at the 2017 Asian Winter Games
Asian Games gold medalists for Kazakhstan
Universiade silver medalists for Kazakhstan
Universiade medalists in biathlon
Competitors at the 2015 Winter Universiade
21st-century Kazakhstani people